Osteochilus kelabau is a species of cyprinid fish endemic to eastern Borneo.

References

Taxa named by Canna Maria Louise Popta
Fish described in 1904
Osteochilus